Barbara Ann Perry is a presidency and U.S. Supreme Court expert, as well as a biographer of the Kennedys. She is also the Gerald L. Baliles Professor and Director of Presidential Studies at the University of Virginia's Miller Center, where she co-chairs the Presidential Oral History Program.  As an oral historian, Perry has conducted more than 100 interviews for the George H. W. Bush and George W. Bush Presidential Oral History Projects, researched the President Clinton Project interviews, and directed the Edward Kennedy Oral History Project.

Early life and education
Perry was born in Louisville, Kentucky.

Perry earned a Bachelor of Arts degree in Political Science from University of Louisville. Perry earned a Master of Arts degree in Politics, philosophy, and economics from Hertford College, Oxford. Perry earned a Ph.D. in American government from the University of Virginia.

Career

From 1989 to 2010 Perry was a member of the Department of Government at Sweet Briar College, where she became the Carter Glass Professor and established the Center for Civic Renewal.  She served as the 1994-95 Judicial Fellow at the U.S. Supreme Court.

Perry assisted the Chief Justice in researching and writing speeches and provided briefings for hundreds of foreign dignitaries from around the world.  In 2006-07 Perry served as a Senior Fellow at the McConnell Center at the University of Louisville and remains a Non-Resident Fellow there.

Perry is the Director of Presidential Studies at University of Virginia's Miller Center. Perry is the Co-chair of Presidential Oral History Program.

Perry has lectured to public audiences across the country and in numerous teacher institutes, sponsored by the Supreme Court Summer Institute, Street Law, and the Gilder Lehrman Institute of American History.  She has also served as an adjunct professor at the Federal Executive Institute in Charlottesville, Virginia, and provided seminars for the Aspen Institute and the New York Historical Society.  Her topics have included Supreme Court appointments, John F. Kennedy, the presidency, and political leadership.  She is currently collaborating with designers of the Robert F. Kennedy Democracy Center in Washington, D.C.  Perry chairs the Steering Committee for the Henry J. Abraham Distinguished Lecture, held each spring at the University of Virginia Law School.

Perry frequently provides political analysis of and historical context for current public affairs to media outlets throughout the nation and the world, appearing as a quoted expert in newspaper features, providing radio and television interviews, and writing op-eds. She regularly contributes to the University of Virginia's blog, “Thoughts from the Lawn.”

Works

A "Representative" Supreme Court?  The Impact of Race, Religion, and Gender on Appointments (Greenwood 1991) 
The Priestly Tribe: The Supreme Court's Image in the American Mind (Praeger 1999; winner of a 2001 Choice Award) 
Freedom and the Court: Civil Rights and Liberties in the United  States, 8th edition (with Henry J. Abraham, University Press of Kansas 2003)  
Jacqueline Kennedy: First Lady of the New Frontier (University Press of Kansas 2004) 
The Michigan Affirmative Action Cases (University Press of Kansas 2007) 
The Supremes: An Introduction to the United States Supreme Court Justices, 2nd ed. (Peter Lang 2009) 
Rose Kennedy: The Life and Times of a Political Matriarch (W.W. Norton 2013) 
41: Inside the Presidency of George H.W. Bush (edited with Michael Nelson; Cornell University Press 2014) 
42: Inside the Presidency of Bill Clinton (edited with Michael Nelson and Russell Riley; Cornell University Press 2016) 
Edward Kennedy: An Oral History (Oxford University Press, 2019)

Awards 
1994-1995 Tom C. Clark Award.
 2012 Scholar Award in Political Science. Presented by Virginia Social Science Association.
 2013 Silver Good Citizenship Medal. Presented by The Sons of American Revolution, Virginia Society.
 2014 Alumni Fellow. Presented by University of Louisville College of Arts & Sciences. (October 16, 2014)

References

External links
 

Year of birth missing (living people)
Living people
University of Louisville alumni
University of Virginia alumni
Alumni of Hertford College, Oxford
University of Virginia fellows
American women political scientists
American political scientists
American political writers
Writers from Louisville, Kentucky
Kentucky women writers
Kentucky women in politics
American women non-fiction writers
21st-century American women